The Orange Party is a political party in the Comoros led by Mohamed Daoudou.

History
The party first contested national elections in the 2015 parliamentary elections, when it received 6% of the vote, but failed to win a seat. The party nominated Daoudou as its candidate for the 2016 presidential elections, in which he finished seventh out of 25 candidates with 4% of the vote. Although the party's votes share fell to 4% in the 2020 elections, it won two seats, becoming the second-largest party in the Assembly of the Union.

References

Political parties in the Comoros